Loxocrambus mohaviellus is a moth in the family Crambidae. It was described by William Trowbridge Merrifield Forbes in 1920. It is found in North America, where it has been recorded from California.

References

Crambini
Moths described in 1920
Moths of North America